Julio Loscos (born 14 April 1961) is a Cuban weightlifter. He competed in the men's featherweight event at the 1980 Summer Olympics.

References

1961 births
Living people
Cuban male weightlifters
Olympic weightlifters of Cuba
Weightlifters at the 1980 Summer Olympics
Place of birth missing (living people)
Pan American Games medalists in weightlifting
Pan American Games gold medalists for Cuba
Weightlifters at the 1983 Pan American Games
20th-century Cuban people